Per Vers, runoilija is the second album of Juice Leskinen & Coitus Int, released in 1974.

Track listing
All tracks by Juice Leskinen, unless where noted.

Side A
"Suihke kainaloon" - 1:28
"Hän hymyilee kuin lapsi" (Alatalo) - 3:37
"Panomies" - 2:31
"Keuhkoon pistää" (Alatalo, Harri Rinne) - 4:03
"Per Vers, runoilija" - 3:53
"Elämässä pitää olla runkkua" - 3:19
"Juankoski, Here I Come" - 2:15

Side B
"Odysseus" (Alatalo, Leskinen) - 4:21
"Tango Iloharjulla" - 1:49
"Kuopio tanssii ja soi" - 2:59
"Valtatie 9" - 2:19
"Leidi leidi" - 1:39
"Nuku" - 3:26
"Afroditen poika" - 2:21

Personnel
Juice Leskinen - guitar, vocals
Mikko Alatalo - accordion, banjo, guitar, harmonica, vocals
Eetu Tuominen - guitar, vocals
Pena Penninkilampi - organ, vocals
Juuso Nordlund - bass, vocals
Juke Aronen - drums

Notes

1974 albums
Juice Leskinen albums